Samuel Franklin Levine (born March 12, 1982) is an American actor, comedian and podcaster. He is known for his portrayal of Neal Schweiber on NBC's Freaks and Geeks and PFC Hirschberg in the 2009 film Inglourious Basterds. Levine was also the sidekick and fill-in host on the internet talk show Kevin Pollak's Chat Show. Levine was a regular competitor on Collider's Movie Trivia Schmoedown. He returned to the Schmoedown in 2019 and was the manager of The Usual Suspects faction until he disbanded them before the start of the 2022 season. He returned to the Schmoedown as a competitor for the 2022 season, defeating Marisol McKee for the singles championship.

Early life
Levine was born in Park Ridge, Illinois, the son of Lynne, a mortgage broker, and Harris Levine, a dentist. He was raised in Fort Lee, New Jersey. Levine is Jewish.

Career
Levine began performing stand-up comedy at bar mitzvahs at age 12. After having seen him perform, Lisa Kudrow advised him that he should start auditioning in Manhattan.

When Levine began his acting career, he added the extra "M" to his name as there was already a Sam Levine registered with the Screen Actors Guild.

Levine was cast as a character in the sixth and final season of ABC's Lost in a small role that was written for him by Lost co-creator Damon Lindelof. Lindelof had frequently told Levine, "I'm going to write you something on the show". Levine played a clerk in the twelfth episode, "Everybody Loves Hugo."

He also regularly appears on Doug Benson's Doug Loves Movies podcasts and fills in as host of the Leonard Maltin Game when not taped in front of a live studio audience so Doug can play the game as a contestant. Benson has nicknamed Levine both "Samm the Ma'am Levine" and "Lil' Wolverine". Benson referred to 2011 as "The Summer of Samm" because Levine played the game so frequently and competitively.

Levine has also been a regular participant on Kevin Pollak's Chat Show since the 1st episode on March 22, 2009, when he was the second guest. He was a guest on Episode 19 as well, just as the show was about to evolve to one guest for the duration of an episode.

In February 2014, Levine was voted 99th in VH1's Top 100 Child Stars.

Levine was a regular competitor on Collider's Movie Trivia Schmoedown where, on December 22, 2017, he won the singles championship. On May 15, 2018, he won the team championship.

Personal life
In March 2020, editor and fellow Movie Trivia Schmoedown competitor Rachel Cushing announced that she and Levine were engaged. The couple married in May 2022.

Filmography

Film

Television

Web

Written works
 Strip Poker (1999)

References

External links

1982 births
20th-century American male actors
21st-century American male actors
Male actors from Chicago
American people of Austrian-Jewish descent
American male child actors
Jewish American male actors
American male comedians
American male film actors
American male television actors
American male voice actors
Living people
Comedians from Illinois
20th-century American comedians
21st-century American comedians
21st-century American Jews